Marion Dane Bauer (born November 20, 1938) is an American children's author.

Bauer was born on November 20, 1938, and brought up in Oglesby, a small prairie town in Northern Illinois. She was educated at LaSalle-Peru-Oglesby Junior College, the University of Missouri and the University of Oklahoma, where she graduated in 1962. She married Ronald Bauer, raising their two children as well as being a foster parent for other children. That marriage ended in divorce after 28 years. She has taught English at a Wisconsin high school and classes in creative writing in Minnesota. Marion was one of the founders of the Master of  Fine Arts in Writing for Children and Young Adults at the Vermont College of Fine Arts. She lives and works in Saint Paul, Minnesota.

Marion wanted to be a writer from an early age. As a child, she says, "I constantly made [stories] up in my head, for my dolls, for my friends. I acted them out using my cigar box filled with marbles as characters." An aunt gave her vital encouragement during her teenage years, by taking her work seriously and urging her to continue writing. Bauer recalls that "the example of someone who loved writing and found doing it both good and important, probably influenced me more deeply than any other."

Rain of Fire (1983) won the Jane Addams Children's Book Award in 1984. Bauer received the Kerlan Award in 1986. On My Honor (1986) won a Newbery Medal Honor in 1987, and won the William Allen White Children's Book Award in 1989. Am I Blue, an anthology of children's fiction about gay and lesbian issues, won a Lambda Literary Award in 1994, and the Stonewall Book Award for literature in 1995. The Longest Night won a Golden Kite Award for picture-book text in 2009.

Books 
 Shelter from the Wind, 1976
 Foster Child, 1977
 Tangled Butterfly, 1980
 Rain of Fire, 1983
 Like Mother, Like Daughter, 1985
 On My Honor (Newbery Medal Winner), 1986
 Touch the Moon, 1987
 A Dream of Queens and Castles, 1990
 Face to Face, 1991
 What's Your Story?: a young person's guide to writing fiction, 1992
 Ghost Eye, 1992
 A Taste of Smoke, 1993
 (ed.) Am I Blue?: coming out from the silence, 1994
 A Question of Trust, 1994
 A Writer's Story: from life to fiction, 1995
 When I Go Camping with Grandma, 1995
 If You Were Born a Kitten, 1997
 Alison's Wings, 1997
 Alison's Puppy, 1997
 Alison's Fierce and Ugly Halloween, 1997
 Turtle Dream's, 1997
 Christmas in the Forest, 1998
 Bear's Hiccups, 1998
 An Early Winter, 1999
 Sleep, Little One, Sleep, 1999
 The Double Digit Club, 2000
 Grandmother's Song, 2000
 Jason's Bears, 2000
 My Mother is Mine, 2001
 If you Had a Nose Like an Elephant's Trunk, 2001
 Runt, 2002
 The Kissing Monster, 2002
 Uh-Oh!, 2002
 Frog's Best Friend, 2002
 Love Song for a Baby, 2002
 Land of the Buffalo Bones : the diary of Mary Ann Elizabeth Rodgers, an English girl in Minnesota, 2003. In the Dear America series.
 Snow, 2003
 Wind, 2003
 Why Do Kittens Purr?, 2003
 Toes, Ears & Nose!, 2003
 The Double-Digit Club, 2004
 The Very Best Daddy of All, 2004
 A Mama for Owen, 2004
 Clouds, 2004
 Rain, 2004
 A Bear Named Trouble, 2005
 The Blue Ghost, 2005
 Easter is Coming, 2005
 A Recipe for Valentine's Day, 2005
 Waiting for Christmas, 2005
 If Frogs Made Weather, 2005
 Niagara Falls, 2006
 The Rocky Mountains, 2006
 The Grand Canyon, 2006
 Christmas Lights, 2006
 I'm Not Afraid of Halloween!, 2006
 The Statue of Liberty, 2007
 Mount Rushmore, 2007
 The Mighty Mississippi, 2007
 The Secret of the Painted House, 2007
 Killing Miss Kitty and Other Sins, 2007
 Baby Bear Discovers the World, 2007
 A Mama for Owen, 2007
 The Red Ghost, 2008
 The Green Ghost, 2008
 Some Babies Are Wild, 2008
 Yellowstone, 2008
 Volcano!, 2008
 Flood!, 2008
 Earthquake!, 2009
 The Very Little Princess, 2009
 The Christmas Baby, 2009
 Martin Luther King, Jr. - My First Biography, 2009
 The Longest Night, 2009
 One Brown Bunny, 2009
 How Do I Love You?, 2009
 Cutest Critter, 2010
 Christopher Columbus - My First Biography, 2010
 Harriet Tubman - My First Biography, 2010
 Thank You for Me!, 2010
 The Longest Night, 2011
 In Like a Lion, Out Like a Lamb, 2011
 Benjamin Franklin - My First Biography, 2011
 The Golden Ghost, 2011
 The Very Little Princess - Rose's Story, 2011
 The Very Little Princess - Zoey's Story, 2011
 Dinosaur Thunder, 2012
 Halloween Forest, 2012
 Little Dog, Lost, 2012
 Celebrating Arizona, 2013
 Celebrating Texas, 2013
 Celebrating New York, 2013
 Celebrating Florida, 2013
 Celebrating California, 2013
 Celebrating Virginia and Washington, D.C., 2013
 Celebrating North Carolina, 2014
 Celebrating Washington State, 2014
 Celebrating Massachusetts, 2014
 Celebrating Illinois, 2014
 Crinkle, Crackle, Crack, It's Spring, 2015
 Little Cat's Luck, 2016
 Sun, 2016
 Rainbow, 2016
 Winter Dance, 2017
 Jump Little Wood Ducks, 2017
 The Stuff of Stars, 2018
 The Appalachian Trail, 2020
 Sunshine, 2021
 Moon - Our Universe Series, 2021
 Mars - Our Universe Series, 2021
 Earth - Our Universe Series, 2021

References

Additional Sources

External links
 Marion Dane Bauer's website

1938 births
Living people
American children's writers
Writers from Illinois
People from Oglesby, Illinois
American lesbian writers
Lambda Literary Award for Children's and Young Adult Literature winners
Stonewall Book Award winners
American women children's writers
University of Missouri alumni
University of Oklahoma alumni
21st-century American women writers